Stueng Hav District is one of four districts (srok) of Sihanoukville province in Cambodia. In 1998, it had a population of 13,108.

References

Districts of Sihanoukville province